The Battle of Jabal Shammar, or Battle of Umm Radh'ma took place on August 1929, between a raiding rebellious Ikhwan party and the ally tribes of Ibn Saud. It was the second large scale engagement of the Ikhwan Revolt in Arabia. The rebel Ikhwan tribesmen were defeated by the loyal pro-Saudi forces.

Scope of the battle
After the defeat in Sabillah, Ikhwan tribesmen and government troops clashed again in the Jabal Shammar region, on August 1929, resulting in the deaths of some 1,000 men. 

According to Ibn Saud Information Resource, the battle, fought between Ikhwan raiders under command of Azaiyiz, son of Faisal al-Dawish, and the loyal Saudi forces of Shammar tribesmen, under the leadership of  Nida bin Naheer, was "furious" and "many fell". Both party leaders, Azaiyiz of the Ikhwan and Nida of the Shammar fell in the battle.

See also
Emirate of Jabal Shammar
Ikhwan raids on Transjordan

References

Jabal Shammar (1929)
Conflicts in 1929
1929 in Asia